Yerko Ignacio Araya Cortés (born 14 February 1986 in Antofagasta) is a Chilean racewalker. He competed in the 20 km walk at the 2012 Summer Olympics, where he placed 41st.

He has a twin brother, Edward, who is also a racewalker.

Personal bests

Track walk
10,000 m: 40:48.94 min –  Canberra, 14 Enero 2018
20,000 m: 1:20:47.2 hrs (ht) –  Buenos Aires, 5 June 2011

Road walk
10 km: 43:41 min –  Los Ángeles, 3 April 2004
20 km: 1:21:26 hrs –  Canberra, 21 February 2016

Competition record

References

External links

Sports reference biography

1986 births
Living people
Twin sportspeople
Chilean twins
Chilean male racewalkers
Olympic athletes of Chile
Athletes (track and field) at the 2012 Summer Olympics
Athletes (track and field) at the 2016 Summer Olympics
People from Antofagasta
World Athletics Championships athletes for Chile
Athletes (track and field) at the 2011 Pan American Games
Athletes (track and field) at the 2019 Pan American Games
Pan American Games competitors for Chile
Athletes (track and field) at the 2018 South American Games
South American Games bronze medalists for Chile
South American Games medalists in athletics
21st-century Chilean people